Paravalsa is a genus of fungi within the family Valsaceae. This is a monotypic genus, containing the single species Paravalsa indica.

References

External links
Paravalsa at Index Fungorum

Diaporthales
Monotypic Sordariomycetes genera